The Rolls-Royce Avon was the first axial flow jet engine designed and produced by Rolls-Royce. Introduced in 1950, the engine went on to become one of their most successful post-World War II engine designs. It was used in a wide variety of aircraft, both military and civilian, as well as versions for stationary and maritime power.

An English Electric Canberra powered by two Avons made the first un-refuelled non-stop transatlantic flight by a jet, and a BOAC de Havilland Comet 4 powered by four Avons made the first scheduled transatlantic crossing by a jet airliner.

Production of the Avon aero engine version ended after 24 years in 1974. Production of the Avon-derived industrial version, currently produced by Siemens, continues to this day.

As of 2011, 1,200 Industrial Avons have been sold, and the type has established a 60,000,000 hour record for its class.

Design and development 
The engine was initially a private venture put forward for the English Electric Canberra. Originally known as the AJ.65 for Axial Jet, 6,500 lbf the engine was based on an initial project concept by Alan Arnold Griffith. which combined an axial compressor with a combustion system and single-stage turbine using principles proven in the Rolls-Royce Nene engine.

Design work began in 1945. The Avon design team was initially headed by Stanley Hooker assisted by Geoff Wilde. Development of the engine was moved from Barnoldswick to Derby in 1948 and Hooker subsequently left the company, moving to Bristol Engines.

The first engine ran on 25 March 1947, with a 12-stage compressor. The engine was difficult to start, would not accelerate and broke first-stage blades. Two-position inlet guide vanes and compressor bleed were among the design changes which allowed the engine, as the RA.2, to run a 25-hour test and fly in the two outboard positions on the converted Avro Lancastrian military serial VM732, from Hucknall on 15 August 1948.

The first production engine, which needed a two-stage turbine, was the RA.3, or Avon Mk 101. Several modified versions of this design were produced in the Mk. 100 series.

The Avon 200 series was a complete redesign having very little in common with earlier Marks. Differences included a completely new combustion section and a 15-stage compressor based on that of the Armstrong-Siddeley Sapphire. The first application was the Vickers Valiant.

Operational history 

The engine entered production in 1950 as the RA.3/Mk.101 with  thrust in the English Electric Canberra B.2. Similar versions were used in the Canberra B.6, Hawker Hunter and Supermarine Swift. Uprated versions followed, the RA.7/Mk.114 with  thrust in the de Havilland Comet C.2, the RA.14/Mk.201,  in the Vickers Valiant and the RA.26,  used in the Comet C.3 and Hawker Hunter F.6. An Avon-powered de Havilland Comet 4 flew the first scheduled transatlantic jet service in 1958. The highest thrust version was the RA.29 Mk.301/2 (RB.146) used in later versions of the English Electric Lightning. It produced  with afterburning. Other aircraft to use the Avon included the de Havilland Sea Vixen, Supermarine Scimitar  and Fairey Delta2.

The RA.3/Mk.109 was produced under licence by Svenska Flygmotor as the RM5,  and an uprated RA.29 as the RM6 with  thrust. The RM5 powered the Saab 32 Lansen and the RM6 powered the Saab 35 Draken and all-weather fighter version of the Lansen (J 32B).

300 Avon 113s, and a larger number of Avon 203s were produced under licence in Belgium by Fabrique Nationale.
 
In the US the RA.28-49 was used in the VTOL Ryan X-13 Vertijet aircraft.

In Australia, the Avon was used by Commonwealth Aircraft Corporation in the CA-27 Avon-Sabre.

The Avon continued in production for the Sud Aviation Caravelle and English Electric (BAC) Lightning until 1974, by which time over 11,000 had been built. It remained in operational service with the RAF until 23 June 2006 in the English Electric Canberra PR.9.

Initial design work was done on the 2-spool RB.106/RB.128 as an Avon successor for large supersonic fighters.

Variants and designations 

AJ65The original designation, standing for Axial Jet 6,500 lbf thrust
RA.1Prototype engines for testing and development.
RA.2Pre-production engines for testing – 
RA.3Civil designation for the first Avon production mark. First avon with a two-stage turbine. – 
RA.7Civil designation for the uprated version of the Avon RA.3. Electrically started. – 
RA.7RRA.7 with reheat. Meant for use with an afterburner. Explosive-cartridge started. –  without afterburner,  with afterburner.
RA.14Civil designation for the uprated version of the Avon with can-annular combustion chamber and Sapphire style compressor – 
RA.19
RA.19RRA.19 with reheat. –  with afterburner.
RA.21Production engine developed from the RA.7 – 
RA.21RProduction engine developed from the RA.7R. Same as the Avon Mk.21.
RA.24
RA.24RSame as the Avon Mk.47A.
RA.25Civil Mk.503
RA.26Further improvements to the Avon 200 series – Civil Mk.521
RA.28Second generation variant – 
RA.29Civil designation for the Mk.300 series (used by the Sud Aviation Caravelle)
RA.29/1
RA.29/3
RA.29/6Same as the Avon Mk.533 – 
RB.146Rolls-Royce designation for Avon Series 300

Avon Series 100 
Avon Series 100 are early military versions of the Avon.
Avon Mk.100Military designation for the RA.3 Avon – 
Avon Mk.101C
Avon Mk.113
Avon Mk.114Military designation for the RA.7 Avon – 
Avon Mk.115Same as the Avon Mk.23 – 
Avon Mk.117
Avon Mk.118
Avon Mk.20Australian version built on license by CAC for the CAC Sabre Mk.31 – 
Avon Mk.21Afterburning Swedish version built by RR and on license by SFA for the Saab 32A/C. Same as the RA.21R. Designated RM5A1. –  without afterburner,  with different afterburners.
Avon Mk.21AImproved Mk.21 with increased diameter on the engine outlet for more power. Built by RR and on license by SFA for the Saab 32A/C. Designated RM5A2. –  without afterburner,  with different afterburners.
Avon Mk.23Same as the Avon Mk.115. Non-afterburning Swedish version built by RR for the Hawker Hunter Mk.50. Designated RM5B1. – 
Avon Mk.24Non-afterburning Swedish version built by RR for the Hawker Hunter Mk.50. Designated RM5B2.
Avon Mk.25Non-afterburning Swedish version built by RR for the Hawker Hunter Mk.50. Designated RM5B3.
Avon Mk.26Australian version built by CAC for the CAC Sabre Mk.32 –

Avon Series 200 
Avon Series 200 are uprated military versions of the Avon with can-annular combustion chamber and Sapphire style compressor.
Avon Mk.200 – 
Avon Mk.47AAfterburning Swedish version built by RR and on license by SFA for the Saab 32B. Same as the RA.24R. Designated RM6A. –  without afterburner,  with afterburner.
Avon Mk.48AAfterburning Swedish version built by RR and on license by SFA for the Saab 35A/B/C. Designated RM6B. –  without afterburner,  with afterburner.

Avon Series 300 
Avon Series 300 are further developed military after-burning versions of the Avon for the English Electric Lightning.
Avon Mk.300 – 
Avon Mk.301The ultimate Military Avon for the English Electric Lightning –  dry,  wet.
Avon Mk.302Essentially similar to the Mk.301
Avon Mk.60Afterburning Swedish version built by RR and on license by SFA for the Saab 35 Draken D/F. Same as the RA.29R. Designated RM6C. –  without afterburner,  with afterburner.
Westinghouse XJ54Avon 300-series scaled-down by Westinghouse to 105 lb/sec airflow to produce 6,200 lb thrust.

Avon Series 500 
Avon Series 500 are civilian equivalents to the military Avon Series 200 variants.
Avon Mk.504
Avon Mk.506
Avon Mk.521
Avon Mk.522
Avon Mk.524
Avon Mk.524B
Avon Mk.525
Avon Mk.525B
Avon Mk.527
Avon Mk.527B
Avon Mk.530
Avon Mk.531
Avon Mk.531B
Avon Mk.532R
Avon Mk.532R-B
Avon Mk.533Same as the RA.29/6 – 
Avon Mk.533R
Avon Mk.533R-11A

Swedish designations 
Reaktionsmotor 3A – RM3ASwedish designation for the Avon Mk.101C
Reaktionsmotor 5A1 – RM5A1Swedish designation for the Avon Mk.21
Reaktionsmotor 5A2 – RM5A2Swedish designation for the Avon Mk.21A
Reaktionsmotor 5B1 – RM5B1Swedish designation for the Avon Mk.23
Reaktionsmotor 5B2 – RM5B2Swedish designation for the Avon Mk.24
Reaktionsmotor 5B3 – RM5B3Swedish designation for the Avon Mk.25
Reaktionsmotor 6A – RM6ASwedish designation for the Avon Mk.47A
Reaktionsmotor 6B – RM6BSwedish designation for the Avon Mk.48A
Reaktionsmotor 6C – RM6CSwedish designation for the Avon Mk.60

Applications

Military aviation 
CAC Sabre
de Havilland Sea Vixen
English Electric Canberra
English Electric Lightning
Fairey Delta 2
Hawker Hunter
Ryan X-13 Vertijet
Saab 32 Lansen
Saab 35 Draken
Supermarine Swift 
Supermarine Scimitar 
Vickers Valiant

Civil aviation 
de Havilland Comet
Sud Aviation Caravelle

Other uses 
The Avon is also currently marketed as a compact, high reliability, stationary power source. As the AVON 1533,  it has a maximum continuous output of 21,480 shp (16.02 MW) at 7,900 rpm and a thermal efficiency of 30%. An example can be found at Didcot Power Station in the United Kingdom where four Avon generators are used to provide Black start services to assist in a restart of the National Grid in the event of a system-wide failure, or to provide additional generating capacity in period of very high demand. 
As a compact electrical generator, the type EAS1 Avon based generator can generate a continuous output of 14.9 MW.

Survivors 
Several Avon-powered Hawker Hunter aircraft remain airworthy in private ownership in 2010.
Thunder City in South Africa as of 2011 operated two Avon-powered English Electric Lightnings.
SWAHF operates three Saab Lansen and two Saab Draken airworthy for air shows.

Engines on display 

A Rolls-Royce Avon Mk 1 is on display at Amrita University, Coimbatore, Tamil Nadu in the Department of Aerospace Engineering's Lab.
A Mk 524 Avon has been restored at the Museo Nacional de Aeronáutica de Argentina by the Museum Friend's Association in Moron, Argentina and is now on display.
An Avon Mk.203 was donated by Rolls-Royce to the National Museum of the United States Air Force in July 1986 for public display.
A Rolls-Royce Avon is on public display at the Midland Air Museum.
A preserved Rolls-Royce Avon Mk.203 is on display at the Royal Air Force Museum London.
A partially sectioned Mk.101 Avon is on display at the Royal Air Force Museum Cosford.
A Rolls-Royce Avon is on display at the Australian National Aviation Museum, Moorabbin, Victoria, Australia
A Rolls-Royce Avon is on public display at East Midlands Aeropark
A Rolls-Royce Avon is on display at the Fleet Air Arm Museum at RNAS Yeovilton.
Several RR Avon engines are on display at the Queensland Air Museum, Caloundra, Australia
A Rolls-Royce Avon engine is on public display at the Historical Aircraft Restoration Society museum at Illawarra Regional Airport, New South Wales, Australia.
A Rolls-Royce Avon engine is on public display at the Parkes Aviation Museum in Parkes, New South Wales, Australia.
A Rolls-Royce Avon is on display at the Classic Flyers Aircraft Museum, Mt Maunganui, Bay of Plenty, New Zealand.
A Rolls-Royce Avon Mk.26 is on display at Mikes Dyno Tuning and Performance Engines, Dandenong, Victoria, Australia
A Rolls-Royce Avon (GAF) is on display at the South Australian Aviation Museum, Port Adelaide, South Australia.
A Rolls-Royce Avon is on public display in the car park (under cover) at South Lanarkshire College, East Kilbride as an exhibit about Nae Pasaran.
A Rolls-Royce Avon MK 101 is on display at the entrance foyer of Faculty of Engineering, University of Peradeniya which was gifted by prof S. Mahalingam (engineer)

Specifications (Avon 301R)

See also

References

Notes

Bibliography 

Gunston, Bill. World Encyclopaedia of Aero Engines. Cambridge, England. Patrick Stephens Limited, 1989.

External links 

The fascinating story of the Rolls Royce Avon turbojet engine, the first Rolls Royce axial flow turbojet
National Museum of USAF – Avon MK 203 Turbojet
"Rolls-Royce Avon" a 1955 Flight article on the Avon
"Rolls-Royce Avon 200 Series" a 1957 Flight article

Avon
1940s turbojet engines
Aero-derivative engines
Products introduced in 1950
Axial-compressor gas turbine engines